The Woman in the Window is a 1944 American film noir directed by Fritz Lang and starring Edward G. Robinson, Joan Bennett, Raymond Massey, and Dan Duryea. It tells the story of a psychology professor (Edward G. Robinson) who meets a young femme fatale (Joan Bennett) and murders her lover in self-defense.

Based on J. H. Wallis' 1942 novel Once Off Guard, the story features two surprise twists at the end. Screenwriter Nunnally Johnson, having written the script for The Grapes of Wrath (1940), was invited by International Pictures to a picture deal, and The Woman in the Window was chosen as its premiere project. According to some sources,  Lang substituted the film's dream ending in place of the originally scripted suicide ending to conform with the moralistic Production Code of the time. However, Lang claimed that it was his idea when asked directly in an interview.

The term "film noir" originated as a genre description in part because of The Woman in the Window.

Plot
After college professor Richard Wanley sends his wife and two children off on vacation, he goes to his club to meet friends. Next door, Wanley sees a striking oil portrait of Alice Reed in a storefront window. He and his friends talk about the beautiful painting and its subject. Wanley stays at the club and reads Song of Songs. When he leaves, Wanley stops at the portrait and meets Reed, who is standing near the painting watching people gaze at it. Reed convinces Wanley to join her for drinks.

Later, they go to Reed's home, but an unexpected visit from her rich clandestine lover Claude Mazard, known to Reed initially only as Frank Howard, leads to a fight in which Wanley kills Mazard in self-defense. Wanley and Reed conspire to cover up the murder, and Wanley disposes of Mazard's body in the country. However, Wanley leaves many clues, and there are a number of witnesses. One of Wanley's friends from the club, district attorney Frank Lalor, has knowledge of the investigation, and Wanley is invited back to the crime scene as Lalor's friend but not as a suspect. On several occasions, Wanley slips and says things that seem to indicate that he may know more about the murder than he should, but Lalor does not suspect Wanley.

As the police gather more evidence, Reed is blackmailed by Heidt, a crooked ex-cop and Mazard's bodyguard. Wanley and Reed discuss the problem, and he concludes that the best way to deal with a blackmailer is to kill him. Wanley gives Reed prescription medicine in powder form for the murder. When Heidt arrives to collect his extorted payment, he suggests that she leave the country with him in exchange for forgetting about the crime. Reed plays along, but Heidt is suspicious when she insists he drink from his tainted cocktail. He angrily takes the money and leaves after deducing her plan. Reed calls Wanley to tell him of the failed attempt, causing him to overdose on the remaining prescription powder in a suicide attempt.

Meanwhile, Heidt is killed in a shootout immediately after leaving Reed's home, and police believe that Heidt is Mazard's murderer. Reed, seeing that the police have killed Heidt, races to her home to call Wanley, who is slumped over in his chair and apparently dies. In a match cut, Wanley awakens in his chair at his club, and he realizes that the entire ordeal was a dream in which employees from the club were the main characters. As he steps out on the street in front of the painting, a woman asks Wanley for a light. He adamantly refuses and runs down the street.

Cast

 Edward G. Robinson as Professor Richard Wanley
 Joan Bennett as Alice Reed
 Raymond Massey as District Attorney Frank Lalor
 Edmund Breon as Dr. Michael Barkstane
 Dan Duryea as Heidt/Ted, the Doorman
 Thomas E. Jackson as Inspector Jackson, Homicide Bureau
 Dorothy Peterson as Mrs. Wanley
 Arthur Loft as Claude Mazard/Frank Howard/Charlie the Hat-Check Man
 Iris Adrian as Streetwalker

Production

As in Lang's Scarlet Street (1945), Robinson plays a lonely middle-aged man and Duryea and Bennett co-star as the criminal elements. The two films also share the same cinematographer (Milton R. Krasner) and several supporting actors.

In the final scene, Robinson wore a tear-away suit with his original suit underneath. The crew changed the set behind him to complete the return to his club while Robinson remained in the chair.

Reception

Critical response

When the film was released, the staff at Variety magazine lauded the film and wrote, "Nunnally Johnson whips up a strong and decidedly suspenseful murder melodrama in Woman in the Window. The producer, who also prepared the screenplay (from the novel Once off Guard by J.H. Wallis), continually punches across the suspense for constant and maximum audience reaction. Added are especially fine timing in the direction by Fritz Lang and outstanding performances by Edward G. Robinson, Joan Bennett, Raymond Massey and Dan Duryea."

The film holds a 88% rating on Rotten Tomatoes as of May 2022. In August 2015, the online entertainment magazine Paste named the film the best film noir of all time.

Awards

At the 18th Academy Awards, The Woman in the Window was nominated for Best Scoring of a Dramatic or Comedy Picture for Hugo Friedhofer and Arthur Lange. However, Miklós Rózsa won the award for Spellbound (1945).

References

External links

 
 
 
 
 
 The Woman in the Window essay by Spencer Selby at Film Noir of the Week

Streaming audio
 The Woman in the Window on Lux Radio Theater: June 25, 1945
 The Woman in the Window on Theater of Romance: March 26, 1946

1944 films
1944 crime drama films
1940s psychological thriller films
American psychological thriller films
American black-and-white films
Films about dreams
1940s English-language films
Film noir
Films based on American novels
Films directed by Fritz Lang
Films set in New York (state)
American crime drama films
Films with screenplays by Nunnally Johnson
Films scored by Arthur Lange
1940s American films